is a Japanese professional squash player. As of February 2018, she was ranked number 47 in the world.

Career
She has won multiple junior and professional PSA tournaments and has represented Japan internationally.

In 2022, she was part of the Japanese team at the 2022 Women's World Team Squash Championships and was voted the MVP for the event after winning all of her six matches.

References

1999 births
Living people
Japanese female squash players
Asian Games bronze medalists for Japan
Asian Games medalists in squash
Squash players at the 2014 Asian Games
Squash players at the 2018 Asian Games
Medalists at the 2018 Asian Games
20th-century Japanese women
21st-century Japanese women
Competitors at the 2022 World Games